The Philadelphia Gold and Silver Index is an index of thirty precious metal mining companies that is traded on the Philadelphia Stock Exchange. The index is represented by the symbol "XAU", which may be a source of some confusion as this symbol is also used under the ISO 4217 currency standard to denote one troy ounce of gold. The Philadelphia Gold and Silver Index and the NYSE Arca Gold BUGS Index are the two most watched gold indices on the market.

Index components

Source:

See also
Silver as an investment
 NYSE Arca Gold BUGS Index
 Gold as an investment
 Gold mining

References

External links

American stock market indices
Stock market indices by industry